Hypebeast may refer to:

Hypebeast culture, a contemporary youth culture focused on clothing styles
Hypebeast (company), catering to hypebeast culture